Matija Dvorneković (born 1 January 1989) is a Croatian retired footballer.

Club career

Early career
Growing up in Velika Gorica, Dvorneković went through the ranks of the local Radnik, before joining NK Slaven Belupo's top tier U19 team in 2007. His appearances for their youth team landed him a contract in March 2008. Graduating from the academy, Dvorneković was sent on loans to third-tier teams, first for a season to Slaven's feeder club NK Koprivnica and then to NK Križevci for the start of the 2009/2010 season. At the start of 2010, the club agreed to terminate his contract so that he could move to the newly founded HNK Gorica back in his hometown. With Gorica, Dvorneković achieved promotion to the Druga HNL and was a fixture in a team that would win the second tier competition the following season, but, before its end, he made his first international transfer, to FC Nizhny Novgorod.

Nizhny Novgorod
He made his debut in the Russian First Division for FC Nizhny Novgorod on 25 April 2011 in a game against FC Luch-Energiya Vladivostok.

Gorica
On 7 August 2014, Dvorneković signed with Gorica as a free agent.

Kukësi
On 6 January 2016, Dvorneković completed a transfer to Albanian Superliga side Kukësi by joining as a free agent. He made his debut later on 23 January, starting in team's 0–1 away defeat to Teuta Durrës for the first leg of the Albanian Cup quarter-final. On his league debut eight days later, he came off the bench and scored the third goal as Kukësi won 3–0 against Bylis Ballsh at home. During the 2016–17 season, Dvorneković contributed with 4 league goals in 33 appearances as Kukësi won its maiden Albanian Superliga title. Following the end of the season, on 10 June 2017, Kukësi decided not to continue its cooperation with the player as his wage was high, leaving him a free agent in the process.

FH
On the 1st of August 2017, Dvorneković joined the Icelandic Champions Fimleikafélag Hafnarfjarðar He played 8 games for the club.

International career
A former youth international for Croatia, Dvorneković has made 2 competitive appearances for under-19 side.

Honours
Kukësi
Albanian Superliga: 2016–17
Albanian Cup: 2015–16
Albanian Supercup: 2016

References

External links

Matija Dvorneković Croatian league stats at Nogometni magazin 

1989 births
Living people
Footballers from Zagreb
Association football forwards
Croatian footballers
Croatia youth international footballers
NK Slaven Belupo players
NK Koprivnica players
NK Križevci players
HNK Gorica players
FC Nizhny Novgorod (2007) players
FC Volga Nizhny Novgorod players
FC Torpedo Moscow players
FK Kukësi players
Fimleikafélag Hafnarfjarðar players
Second Football League (Croatia) players
Russian First League players
Russian Premier League players
First Football League (Croatia) players
Kategoria Superiore players
Úrvalsdeild karla (football) players
Croatian Football League players
Croatian expatriate footballers
Expatriate footballers in Russia
Croatian expatriate sportspeople in Russia
Expatriate footballers in Albania
Croatian expatriate sportspeople in Albania
Expatriate footballers in Iceland
Croatian expatriate sportspeople in Iceland